Tjoeij Lin Alienilin (born 25 August 1943) is an Indonesian archer who competed in the 1972 Summer Olympic Games in archery.

Olympics 

Alienilin finished 37th in the women's individual event with a score of 2100 points.

References

External links 
 Profile on worldarchery.org

1943 births
Living people
Indonesian female archers
Olympic archers of Indonesia
Archers at the 1972 Summer Olympics
20th-century Indonesian women
21st-century Indonesian women